Pterocyclus is a genus of flowering plant in the family Apiaceae, native from the Himalayas to south-central China and northern Myanmar. The genus was first described by Johann Friedrich Klotzsch in 1862.

Species
, Plants of the World Online accepted the following species:
Pterocyclus angelicoides (DC.) Klotzsch
Pterocyclus forrestii (Diels) Pimenov & Kljuykov
Pterocyclus rotundatus (DC.) Pimenov & Kljuykov
Pterocyclus wolffianus Fedde ex H.Wolff

References

Apioideae